Beijing No. 5 High School  is a prestigious high school located at No.13 of Xiguan Hutong in Dongcheng District, Beijing, China.  

The school is on the list of the beacon high schools in Beijing and ranks in the top positions academically among high schools in Beijing.  In recent years, almost all its new graduates enter universities, and nearly 95% of them into national key universities in China.

The Branch of Beijing No.5 High School is the middle school affiliated with the high school. It is ranked top 3 among middle schools in Dongcheng District.

History
The school was established in 1928 as a middle school for boys.  In 1930, the name was changed from "Common Middle School" (平民中學) to Beiping No. 5 Middle School (北平市立第五中學).  It became co-educational in 1968.

Although the school has been on its current location since 1945, the campus was totally renovated during 1991–1993.

In 1998, the middle school part was spun off into an independent school, although it still retains the "No. 5" in name.

School Motto

Respecting the Teachers, Diligence, Seeking the Truth and Self-reliance (尊师、勤奋、求实、自强).

External links
Beijing No.5 High School website 

High schools in Beijing
Schools in Dongcheng District, Beijing
Educational institutions established in 1928
1928 establishments in China